Berriwillock is a town in the Mallee region in the north-west of the Australian state of Victoria.

Berriwillock is  due west of the Murray River and is a vibrant grain producing community.

Transport
It was formerly served by the Berriwillock railway station on the Kulwin railway line. The line has not carried passenger services since 1977, but is still available for freight (bulk grain), and there are bulk grain silos at the station.

Berriwillock Post Office opened on 16 April 1894 shortly after the arrival of the railway.

Berriwillock wheat scheme
Berriwillock is the home of a charitable scheme where the local farmers grow wheat for charity. In drought years, it may not make a profit to donate, but most years the scheme provides grants to a range of charitable causes. It has been running since 1953. In response to a discussion with the Presbyterian minister, one farmer committed  of land and many others contributed the seed, labour and equipment to plant and harvest the land. As technology has improved, what was once a day's work for 30 farmers and a picnic for their families is now only a few hours for one machine. The proceeds are split 50:50 between Australian and international causes. The proceeds of the first year went to underfed people in Europe and Asia, and to the Melbourne Hospital.

Sport
Golfers play at the Berriwillock Golf Club.

The town is part of the Sea Lake Nandaly Football Club and until 2015 had a game played in Berriwillock every year.

References

External links

Towns in Victoria (Australia)
Mallee (Victoria)